= Myridian =

- Origin: Melbourne, Australia
- Genres: Heavy metal; melodic death metal
- Years active: 2009–present
- Labels: Unsigned
- Members: Felix Lane; Jeremy Landry; Ian Mather; Sarah Lim; Zebådee Scott
- Website: www.facebook.com/MyridianAus/

Myridian are a melodic death metal band from Melbourne, Australia. Formed in 2009, the currently line-up consists of Felix Lane (vocals/bass), Jeremy Landry (guitars), Ian Mather (guitars), Sarah Lim (keyboards/vocals) and Zebådee Scott (drums). To date, Myridian has released two EPs and three full length studio albums, the most recent being Starless released in 2022.

== History ==
=== Formation and early history ===
Formed in 2009, Myridian released A Starless Demo, a three track EP, on 15 June 2011.

== Members ==
=== Current members ===
- Felix Lane - Vocals/Bass
- Zebådee Scott - Drums
- Ian Mather - Guitars
- Jeremy Landry - Guitars
- Sarah Lim - Keyboards

=== Past members ===
- Myles Thomson - Drums (2009)
- Alex Hutchinson - Drums (2009-2013)
- Scott Brierley - Guitars (2009-2017)
- Josh Spivak - Guitars, Vocals (2009-2014)
- Julian Wheeler - Keyboards (2009-2015)
- Tobia Zama - Bass (2011)
- Dan Liston - Keyboards (2015-2020)

== Discography ==
- A Starless Demo - EP (2011)
- Under The Fading Light (2012)
- We, The Forlorn (2015)
- Light in the Abyss (2020)
- Starless - EP (2022)
